Guillaume Baudry (2 October 1657 – 1732) was a gunsmith and gold and silversmith in Lower Canada.

Baudry, who was also written as Beaudry, also went by Des Butes, or Desbutes. He married an armourer’s daughter at Quebec and they settled at Trois-Rivières. They had fifteen children and ensured the future of their family in the area. One son, Jean-Baptiste, became a gunsmith and was one of the first inhabitants of Detroit.

External links 
 Biography at the Dictionary of Canadian Biography Online

French Quebecers
1657 births
1732 deaths